Cecilia Daniel Paresso (born November  22, 1981) is a Tanzanian politician and a member of the CHADEMA political party. She was elected as a member of the Special Seats in 2015. She has bachelor degree from the Open University of Tanzania in 2011.

References 

Living people
1981 births
Chadema politicians
Chadema MPs
Tanzanian MPs 2015–2020
Open University of Tanzania alumni